The 1997 Saint Angelo Chinese Football Super Cup (Chinese: 1997年报喜鸟中国足球超霸杯赛) was the 3rd Chinese Football Super Cup, contested by Chinese Jia-A League 1997 winners Dalian Wanda and 1997 Chinese FA Cup winners Beijing Guoan. Andrés Olivas scored the first golden goal in the Chinese football history, which ensured Beijing Guoan win their first Chinese Football Super Cup title.

Match details

References 

1997 in Chinese football
1997